American singer Fergie has released two studio albums, thirteen singles (including six as a featured artist), and twenty music videos. Throughout her career, she has sold over 35 million albums and 60 million singles worldwide. According to Recording Industry Association of America, Fergie has sold 27.5 million albums & singles in the United States. Fergie was ranked 16th on Billboard's 2000s Top Female Artist of the Decade.  

In 2005, after releasing two studio albums with group The Black Eyed Peas, Fergie announced that she had begun working on a solo project, set for a release in late 2006. Fergie's debut album, The Dutchess, was released in September 2006 and debuted at number three on the Billboard 200 chart. Almost a year later, the album rose to number two. The album spawned five singles that peaked in the top five in the United States, making The Dutchess the first debut album to do so since Milli Vanilli's 1989 debut Girl You Know It's True. The singles "London Bridge", "Glamorous" with Ludacris and "Big Girls Don't Cry" reached number one on the Billboard Hot 100 chart ("London Bridge" reaching the spot in three weeks, the second fastest ascent in Hot 100 history) This made Fergie the first female artist with three number ones from one album since Christina Aguilera in 2000. The second single, "Fergalicious" with will.i.am, and the fifth single, "Clumsy", peaked at number two and number five, respectively. The singles sold over two million downloads each in the US, making The Dutchess the only album in its original release to spawn five singles to do so. The album became the third best-selling album of 2007 in the US, and the twentieth best-selling globally. The album has sold 3.9 million copies in the US, and 6 million worldwide.

Her second studio album Double Dutchess, was released on September 22, 2017. Its lead single, "L.A. Love (La La)" was released in September 2014, and was a commercial success overseas in the UK, peaking at number three on the UK Singles Chart. In the United States, meanwhile, the single peaked at number 27 on the Hot 100 and number five on the Hot Rap Songs. Fergie re-launched promotion of her second studio album Double Dutchess in 2016, with the release of two teaser videos, "Hungry" and the second single "M.I.L.F. $" in July 2016, which became an instant viral sensation, gaining over 244 million views. "M.I.L.F. $" peaked at No. 34 on the Hot 100 and No. 56 on the UK Singles Chart. The third single "Life Goes On" was released on November 11, 2016.

Studio albums

Extended plays

Singles

As lead artist

As featured artist

Charity singles

Promotional singles

Other charted songs

Guest appearances

Music videos

As lead artist

As featured artist

Footnotes

References

Discography
Pop music discographies
Rhythm and blues discographies
Discographies of American artists